SI-MET College of Nursing, Uduma is a professional college of Kasaragod District in India.

History
It was affiliated to Kannur University in the same year.

Courses offered
 B.Sc.in Nursing

Contact information
 Address:  SI-MET College of Nursing, Uduma, Kasaragod -671319 
 Principal : Smt. Treesamma S.
 Phone : 0467-2265277(O)

References

External links
 Official website

Colleges affiliated to Kannur University
Colleges in Kasaragod district
Nursing schools in India